The Iron Church or The Cast Iron Church is any of the three churches built in Liverpool in the early 19th century by John Cragg, who ran the Mersey Iron Foundry.  The churches incorporated substantial cast iron elements into their structure and decoration.  Two of these churches are still in existence and are active Anglican parish churches.  These are St George's Church, Everton, and St Michael's Church, Aigburth.  The third church, now demolished, was St Philip's in Hardman Street.

See also
Tin tabernacle
Bulgarian Iron Church

References

Bibliography

Churches in Liverpool
Church of England church buildings in Merseyside
Gothic Revival church buildings in England
Cast-iron architecture in the United Kingdom